Eastleigh is a neighbourhood  in Nairobi, Kenya. It is located east of the central business district. It is known for its business prowess, as well as "its poor infrastructure.

History
Eastleigh was founded in 1921. At this time, it was formally called Nairobi East Township. While the colonial government originally tried to segregate citizens by race and ethnicity, failures at doing so in the Eastleigh neighbourhood more or less stopped the practice under colonial rule, so class became the general segregating factor afterwards. The colonial government allotted Nairobi's residential estates by race, and Eastleigh was pointed for Asians and elite Africans who worked as clerks, builders or shoemakers. Eastleigh was originally a large Kenyan Asian enclave until independence in 1963. In recent years, the suburb has been dominated by Somali immigrants.

Military
The Eastleigh Airport (Moi Air Base) is located in the northern parts of Eastleigh. The base was the site of the British Royal Air Force base known as RAF Eastleigh. The dual-use facility was also the main civilian international airport in Nairobi for the period 1943-1958 before the opening of the new airport at Embakasi (since named Jomo Kenyatta International Airport).

Since 2012, the neighbourhood and various areas across Kenya have experienced a number of terrorist attacks linked to the Al-Shabaab militant group, which were launched in retaliation for the Kenyan military's deployment of troops in southern Somalia against the insurgents.

Administrative divisions
Administratively, Eastleigh is divided into Eastleigh North and Eastleigh South. Both are part of Nairobi's Pumwani division.

Eastleigh is further partitioned into three areas:

Section I - from Juja Road
Section II - the commercial center
Section III - situated towards Jogoo Road
The postal code for Eastleigh is 00610

Economy

Eastleigh is mostly inhabited by Somalis, except for a few indigenous residents. The suburb's commercial sector is likewise dominated by Somalis, with most businesses owned by the Somali community.

Businesses in the suburb range from small stalls to shopping malls and night lodges. Products are typically imported from Mogadishu and Dubai, and include designer clothing, jewelry and even camel milk.
Starting in late 2012, a mass exodus of Somali residents was reported after a prolonged period of harassment by the Kenyan police and public. Hundreds of Somali entrepreneurs withdrew between Sh10 to Sh40 billion from their bank accounts, with the intention of reinvesting most of that money back home in Somalia. The collective departures most affected Eastleigh's real estate sector, as landlords struggled to find Kenyans able to afford the high rates of the apartments and shops vacated by the Somalis.

Schools
There are a lot of schools located in Eastleigh and it's vicinity, they include;
 Eastleigh High School
 St Teresa Boys High School
 St Teresa Girls High School
 Pumwani Boys High School
 Maina Wajingi High school
 Compit Educational Centre

Notable residents

Hussein Mohamed, Vice Chairman of the Eastleigh Business Association.
Mohamed Amin, a famous photojournalist born in Eastleigh.

References

Eastleigh coordinates

External links

Eastleigh, Nairobi - The Facts
The Standard, February 11, 2007: Eastleigh: A fast growing city within a city

1921 establishments in Kenya
Asian-Kenyan culture in Nairobi
Ethnic enclaves in Africa
Populated places in Kenya
Somalian diaspora in Africa
Suburbs of Nairobi